The 1976 Liège–Bastogne–Liège was the 62nd edition of the Liège–Bastogne–Liège cycle race and was held on 18 April 1976. The race started and finished in Liège. The race was won by Joseph Bruyère of the Molteni team.

General classification

References

1976
1976 in Belgian sport
1976 Super Prestige Pernod